James Braddock may refer to:

 James J. Braddock (1905–1974), American boxer
 James Braddock (cricketer) (1852–?), English cricketer
 Jamie Braddock, fictional character in Marvel Comics
 Colonel James Braddock, fictional character in the Missing in Action film franchise

See also
 Braddock (surname)
 Braddock (disambiguation)
 James (disambiguation)